The 1984 Rhode Island Rams football team was an American football team that represented the University of Rhode Island in the Yankee Conference during the 1984 NCAA Division I-AA football season. In their ninth season under head coach Bob Griffin, the Rams compiled a 10–3 record (4–1 against conference opponents), tied for the conference championship, and lost to Montana State in the NCAA Division I-AA Semifinals. The team was led on offense by quarterback Tom Ehrhardt, a junior transfer from C.W. Post.

Schedule

References

Rhode Island
Rhode Island Rams football seasons
Yankee Conference football champion seasons
Rhode Island Rams football